The 2012–13 Drake Bulldogs men's basketball team represented Drake University during the 2012–13 NCAA Division I men's basketball season. The Bulldogs, led by fifth year head coach Mark Phelps, played their home games at the Knapp Center and were members of the Missouri Valley Conference. They finished the season 15–17, 7–11 in MVC play to finish in three way tie for seventh place. They lost in the quarterfinals of the Missouri Valley tournament to Creighton, and head coach Mark Phelps was fired 6 days later.

Roster

Schedule

|-
!colspan=9| Exhibition

|-
!colspan=9| Regular season

|-
!colspan=9| Missouri Valley Conference tournament

References

Drake Bulldogs men's basketball seasons
Drake
Drake
Drake